The Breeders Crown 3YO Filly Pace is a harness racing event for three-year-old Standardbred fillies pacers. It is one part of the Breeders Crown annual series of twelve races for both Standardbred trotters and trotters. First run in 1985, it is contested over a distance of one mile. Race organizers have awarded the event to various racetracks across North America. The 2017 race was held at Hoosier Park in Anderson, Indiana, United States.

Historical race events
In 2010, Pocono Downs became the first venue to host all 12 events on a single night.

North American Locations
Woodbine Racetrack (Wdb) Ontario (9)
Meadowlands Racetrack (Mxx) New Jersey (6)
Pompano Park (Ppk) Florida (4)
Mohawk Raceway (Moh) Ontario (3)
Pocono Downs (Pcd) Pennsylvania (2)
Garden State Park (Gsp) New Jersey (2)
Colonial Downs (Cln) Virginia (1) 
Freehold Raceway (Fhl) New Jersey (1)
Hazel Park (Hpx) Michigan (1)
Liberty Bell Park (Lib) Pennsylvania (1)
Northfield Park (Nfl) Ohio (1)
Northlands Park (NP) Alberta (1) 
Yonkers Raceway (YR) New York (1)

Records
 Most wins by a driver
 4 – John Campbell (1989, 1991, 1992, 1993)

 Most wins by a trainer
 3 – Robert McIntosh (1992, 1993, 2005)

 Stakes record
 1:49 3/5 – Monkey On My Wheel (2011)

Winners of the Breeders Crown 3YO Filly Pace

See also
List of Breeders Crown Winners

References

Recurring sporting events established in 1984
Harness racing in the United States
Harness racing in Canada
Breeders Crown
Racing series for horses
Horse races in Alberta
Horse races in Florida
Horse races in Michigan
Horse races in New Jersey
Horse races in New York (state)
Horse races in Ohio
Horse races in Ontario
Horse races in Pennsylvania
Horse races in Virginia